This article show all participating team squads at the 2007 FIVB Volleyball World League, played by 16 countries from 25 May to 15 July 2007. The Final Round was held in Katowice, Poland.

The following is the  roster in the 2007 FIVB Volleyball World League.

The following is the  roster in the 2007 FIVB Volleyball World League.

The following is the  roster in the 2007 FIVB Volleyball World League.

The following is the  roster in the 2007 FIVB Volleyball World League.

The following is the  roster in the 2007 FIVB Volleyball World League.

The following is the  roster in the 2007 FIVB Volleyball World League.

The following is the  roster in the 2007 FIVB Volleyball World League.

The following is the  roster in the 2007 FIVB Volleyball World League.

The following is the  roster in the 2007 FIVB Volleyball World League.

The following is the  roster in the 2007 FIVB Volleyball World League.

The following is the  roster in the 2007 FIVB Volleyball World League.

The following is the  roster in the 2007 FIVB Volleyball World League.

The following is the  roster in the 2007 FIVB Volleyball World League.

The following is the  roster in the 2007 FIVB Volleyball World League.

The following is the  roster in the 2007 FIVB Volleyball World League.

The following is the  roster in the 2007 FIVB Volleyball World League.

References

External links
Official website

2007
2007 in volleyball